Uri Alon (Hebrew: אורי אלון; born 1969) is a Professor and Systems Biologist at the Weizmann Institute of Science. His highly cited research investigates gene expression, network motifs and the design principles of biological networks in Escherichia coli and other organisms using both computational biology and traditional experimental wet laboratory techniques.

Education
Alon earned his bachelor's and master's degrees from the Hebrew University of Jerusalem and his Ph.D. in Theoretical Physics from the Weizmann Institute of Science.

Career
After having his interest in biology sparked, Alon headed to Princeton University for his postdoctoral work in experimental biology.  He returned to the Weizmann Institute as a professor.

Alon features in several popular videos on YouTube such as Sunday at the Lab (with Michael Elowitz) and How to Give a Good Talk. As of 2011, he is the author of the most highly bookmarked scientific paper on CiteULike How To Choose a Good Scientific Problem and How to Build a Motivated Research Group.

In 2021 he was appointed visiting professor in the bioengineering department of Stanford University.

Research 
Uri Alon significantly contributed to our understanding of gene regulatory networks and generalized the term network motif in 2002.

Together with his team, he reunited different theories of endocrine feedback loops by introducing the closely related concepts of dynamical compensation and autoimmune surveillance of hypersecreting mutants (ASHM). The theories are able to explain a plethora of phenomena ranging from circannual endocrine rhythms over type 2 diabetes and other common endocrine disorders to alcohol addiction and age-related diseases.

Awards
In 2004 Alon was awarded the Overton Prize for "outstanding accomplishment by a scientist in the early to mid stage of his or her career" by the International Society for Computational Biology. Alon has also been awarded:
 Moore Fellowship, California Institute of Technology (2000)
 EMBO Young Investigator Award (2001)
 IBM Faculty Award (2003)
 Minerva Junior Research Group on Biological Computation (2003)
 Morris L. Levinson Award in Biology (2003)
 Teva Founders Prize (2005)
 European Molecular Biology Organization membership (2007),
 Radcliffe Institute for Advanced Study fellow 2009
 HFSP Nakasone Award (2014)

References

External links
 
 

1969 births
Living people
Members of the European Molecular Biology Organization
Academic staff of Weizmann Institute of Science
Overton Prize winners
Israeli bioinformaticians
Systems biologists
Hebrew University of Jerusalem alumni
Israeli people of Romanian-Jewish descent
Israeli physicists
Network scientists